The demographics of Georgia are inclusive of the ninth most populous state in the United States, with over 10.7 million people (2020 census), just over 3% of America's population.

Population

The United States Census Bureau estimates that the population of Georgia was 10,711,908 as of 2020.

In 2007, Georgia had an estimated population of 9,544,750 which was an increase of 180,809 from the previous year, and an increase of 1,177,125 since 2000. This includes a natural increase since the last census of 438,939 people (that is 849,414 births minus 410,475 deaths) and an increase from net migration of 606,673 people into the state. Immigration from outside the United States resulted in a net increase of 228,415 people, and migration within the country produced a net increase of 378,258 people.

There were 743,000 veterans in 2009.

The top countries of origin for immigrants were Mexico (25.7 percent of immigrants), India (8.6 percent), Korea (4.1 percent), Vietnam (3.5 percent), and Jamaica (3.2 percent).

Race and ethnicity

2020 census
 50.1% Non-Hispanic White,
 32.6% Black or African American
 4.4% Asian American
 0.3% Native American
 0.1% Native Hawaiian and Other Pacific Islander
 10.5% Hispanic or Latino

2010 census
According to the 2010 United States census, Georgia had a population of 9,687,653. In terms of race the population was: 
 59.7% White American (55.9% Non-Hispanic White, 3.8% White Hispanic), 
 30.5% Black or African American
 3.2% Asian American
 0.3% American Indian and Alaska Native 
 0.1% Native Hawaiian and Other Pacific Islander 
 4.0% from Some Other Race (including Hispanics)
 2.1% Multiracial American (including Hispanics)
 8.8% Hispanic or Latino

The largest ancestry groups are: 10.8% American (mostly British descent), 9.5% Irish, 8.9% English, 8.8% Hispanics and Latinos and 8.2% German.  In the 1980 census 1,584,303 Georgians cited that they were of English ancestry out of a total state population of 3,994,817 making them 40% of the state, and the largest ethnic group at the time.  Today, many of these same people cite that they are of "American" ancestry are actually of English descent and some are of Scots-Irish descent, however, they have families that have been in the state so long, in many cases since the colonial period, that they choose to identify simply as having "American" ancestry or do not, in fact, know their own ancestry. Their ancestry primarily goes back to the original Thirteen Colonies and for this reason many of them today simply claim "American" ancestry, though they are of predominantly English ancestry.  

As of 2004, 7.7% of its population was reported as under 5 years of age, 26.4% under 18, and 9.6% were 65 or older. Also as of 2004, females made up approximately 50.6% of the population and African Americans made up approximately 29.6%.

Historically, about half of Georgia's population was composed of African Americans who, prior to the Civil War, were almost exclusively enslaved. The Great Migration of hundreds of thousands of blacks from the rural South to the industrial North from 1914–1970 reduced the African American population.

Georgia had the second fastest growing Asian population growth in the U.S. from 1990 to 2000, more than doubling in size during the ten-year period. Georgia also has a significant and diverse population of Hispanics, especially Mexicans and Puerto Ricans. Most of the recent Hispanic, Asian, Caribbean, and Sub-Saharan African populations is concentrated in the diverse Atlanta metropolitan area, with the rest of Georgia being mostly blacks and whites. In addition, according to census estimates, Georgia ranks third among the states in terms of the percent of the total population that is African American (after Mississippi and Louisiana) and third in numerical Black population after New York and Florida. Georgia was the state with the largest numerical increase in the black population from 2006 to 2007 with 84,000.

Georgia is the state with the third-lowest percentage of older people (65 or older), at 10.1 percent (as of 2008).

The colonial settlement of large numbers of Scottish American, English American and Scotch-Irish Americans in the mountains and piedmont, and coastal settlement by English Americans and African Americans, have strongly influenced the state's culture in food, language and music. The concentration of Africans imported to coastal areas in the 18th century repeatedly from rice growing regions of West Africa led to the development of Gullah-Geechee language and culture in the Low Country among African Americans. They share a unique heritage in which African traditions of food, religion and culture were retained significantly more than any other Black American Community. In the creolization of Lowcountry culture, their foodways became an integral part of all cooking in the Low Country.

About 800,000 people in Georgia reported having Irish ancestry. Germans are the fifth largest ancestry in Georgia. Other European ancestries in Georgia are Italian, French, Polish and Dutch.

Georgia has a growing Latino population. Most Latinos in Georgia are of Mexican ancestry. 

The Muscogee and the Cherokee are the largest Native American tribes in Georgia.

2019 United States Census American Community Survey estimates

According to 2019 US Census Bureau estimates, Georgia's population was 57.8% White (51.8% Non-Hispanic White and 5.9% Hispanic White), 31.9% Black or African American, 4.1% Asian, 3.0% Some Other Race, 0.4% Native American and Alaskan Native, 0.1% Pacific Islander and 2.7% from two or more races.

The White population continues to remain the largest racial category in Georgia and includes the 60.4% of Hispanics who self-identify as White. The remainder of Hispanics self-identify as Some Other Race (27.3%), Multiracial (5.6%), Black (4.1%), American Indian and Alaskan Native (2.2%), Asian (0.3%), and Hawaiian and Pacific Islander (0.1%).

If Hispanics are treated as a separate category from race, Georgia's population was 51.8% White, 31.5% Black or African American, 9.8% Hispanic-Latino, 4.1% Asian, 2.1% Some Other Race, 0.2% Native American and Alaskan Native, 0.1% Pacific Islander and 2.1% from two or more races.

African Americans remain the largest minority group in the state at either 31.9% (including Black Hispanics) or 31.5% (excluding Black Hispanics).

By ethnicity, 9.8% of the total population is Hispanic-Latino (of any race) and 90.2% is Non-Hispanic (of any race). If treated as a category separate from race, Hispanics are the third largest minority group in Georgia.

According to 2018 US Census Bureau estimates, the majority of Hispanics in Georgia are of Mexican descent (58.1% of Hispanics) followed by those of Puerto Rican descent (10.1%), Guatemalan descent (6.3%), Salvadoran descent (4.8%), Cuban descent (3.4%), Colombian descent (3.1%), Honduran descent (2.5%), Dominican descent (2.2%), Venezuelan descent (1.4%), Peruvian descent (1.2%), Spanish (Spain) descent (1.2%), and those of other Hispanic ethnicity or of mixed Hispanic ethnicity (5.7%).

The Asian population in Georgia is diverse with the largest group being that of Indian descent (32.6% of Asians) followed by those of Chinese (excluding Taiwan) descent (15.0%), Vietnamese descent (13.8%), Korean descent (12.2%), Filipino descent (6.0%), Pakistani descent (3.8%), Nepalese descent (2.4%), Japanese descent (2.1%), Burmese descent (1.9%), Hmong descent (1.5%), Bangladeshi descent (1.3%), Cambodian descent (1.1%), Thai descent (1.0%), and those of other Asian ethnicity or of mixed Asian ethnicity (5.3%).

The Native American population of Georgia is small at 34,485 individuals of which 70.5% belong to federally recognized tribes. The largest recognized tribe is Cherokee (5,950 individuals) followed by Chippewa (727), Navajo (502), Sioux (347), and Alaska Natives (76).

Ancestries

Birth data
Note: Births in table don't add up, because Hispanics are counted both by their ethnicity and by their race, giving a higher overall number.

Since 2016, data for births of White Hispanic origin are not collected, but included in one Hispanic group; persons of Hispanic origin may be of any race.

Languages

As of 2010, 87.35% (7,666,663) of Georgia residents age 5 and older spoke English at home as a primary language, while 7.42% (651,583) spoke Spanish, 0.51% (44,702) Korean, 0.44% (38,244) Vietnamese, 0.42% (36,679) French, 0.38% (33,009) Chinese (which includes Mandarin,) and German was spoken as a main language by 0.29% (23,351) of the population over the age of five. In total, 12.65% (1,109,888) of Georgia's population age 5 and older spoke a mother language other than English.

Largest cities

Religion

Georgia is a relatively religious state, with 2 in 3 people stating religion is "very important" in their lives. According to the 2014 U.S. Religious Landscape Study based on telephone interviews conducted by the Pew Research Center, 79 percent of Georgia residents identified as Christian, with two-thirds being Protestants, similar to the population of other Southern states.  The overall breakdown of religious affiliations was as follows:

 Christian:  79%
 Evangelical Protestant: 38%
 Mainline Protestant: 12%
 Historically Black Protestant: 17%
 Roman Catholic: 9%
 Jehovah's Witnesses:2%
 Mormon: 1%
 Orthodox Christian:  <1%
 Other Christian (incl. Unitarians): 1%
 Non-Christian religions:  3%
 Jewish: 1%
 Islamic : 1%
 Buddhist: <1%
 Hindu: <1%
 Other world faiths: <1%
 Other faiths:  2% (New Age, and Native American religions)
 Unaffilitated (religious "nones"):  18% (including agnostics and atheists)
 Nothing in particular:  13%
 Don't know:  1%

The largest Christian denominations by number of adherents in 2000 were the Southern Baptist Convention with 1,719,484; the United Methodist Church with 570,674; and the Catholic Church with 374,185.

LGBT
The city of Atlanta also has one of the highest LGBT populations per capita. It ranks 3rd of all major cities, behind San Francisco and slightly behind Seattle, with 12.8% of the city's total population identifying themselves as gay, lesbian, or bisexual. According to the 2000 United States Census (revised in 2004), Atlanta has the twelfth highest proportion of single-person households nationwide among cities of 100,000 or more residents, which was at 38.5%.

References

 
Georgia